Gishgish or Gish Gish  is a small village in Gilgit-Baltistan, Pakistan, situated just after BarJungle. It has situated 112 and 45 km upstream from Gilgit and Ghakuch respectively. It has consist of two parts one is known as Gishgish Bala and the other is known as Gishgish Pain. The inhabitants of Gishgish Bala belongs to Ayashu family of Hunza. The Successors of Mir Jamal Khan, elder son of Mir Saleem Khan. A peculiar history is attached with this village in connection with Ayashu family of Hunza. Mir Jamal Khan was married with the daughter of Mir Fateh Ali Shah (Ruler of Wakhan). Mir Jamal Khan was murdered as a result of conspiracy for the throne of Hunza. Mir Bakhtiar Khan son of Mir Jamal Khan, he was child at that time, migrated to Ishkoman valley when his cousin Mir Shah Ali Mardan became the first governor of Ishkoman in 1892. Since 1892 the successors of Mir Jamal Khan settled in Gishgish Bala, Ishkoman valley.

The inhabitants of Gishgish Pain belongs to renowned Wakhi family Khaibarey. There are two mosques (jamat khana), two schools and a first aid post. Nearly all of its inhabitants are Wakhi speakers and are migrated from Wakhan in early 19th century. The village is famous for trout fish angling and hunting points which are the source of attraction for the local and national hunters. Mosts of the people are educated and serving in different institution throughout the country and due to this it is included among the economically stable village in the valley according to AKRSP survey.

External links
Gishgish Map at WorldPlaces.net

Populated places in Ghizer District